The 2000–01 Australian region cyclone season was a below average tropical cyclone season. It began on 1 November 2000 and ended on 30 April 2001. The regional tropical cyclone operational plan also defines a tropical cyclone year separately from a tropical cyclone season, which runs from 1 July 2000 to 30 June 2001.

Tropical cyclones in this area are monitored by four Tropical Cyclone Warning Centres (TCWCs): the Australian Bureau of Meteorology in Perth, Darwin, and Brisbane; and TCWC Port Moresby in Papua New Guinea.



Season timeline

Systems

Severe Tropical Cyclone Sam

Sam originated from a tropical low that formed in the Arafura Sea on 28 November. Tracking generally westward, the initial low-pressure area remained generally weak until it entered the Timor Sea, by which time it had strengthened into a tropical cyclone on 5 December. Though a subtropical ridge was forcing the cyclone westward at the time, an approaching shortwave trough caused Sam to track southward the following day, towards the Australian coast. During its southward progression, Sam rapidly intensified, and reached its peak intensity on 7 December. The next day, the storm made landfall near Lagrange, Western Australia at the same intensity. Once inland, Sam was slow to weaken as it recurved eastward, and persisted for nearly a week inland before dissipating on 14 December.

Throughout its existence, Cyclone Sam brought heavy rainfall to a wide swath of northern Australia. Rainfall peaked at in Shelamar over a 48-hour period ending on 11 December. Upon making landfall, damage was considerable, albeit localized. Most of the destruction wrought by Sam occurred near the coast, particularly in Bidyadanga and Anna Springs Station. Some buildings sustained considerable damage, and trees and power lines were felled, resulting in some power outages. Offshore, 163 illegal immigrants aboard two vessels were feared to have drowned, which would make Sam one of the deadliest cyclones in Australian history. However, these people were later accounted for.

Tropical Cyclone Terri

Terri formed on 27 January 2001 near the northern Kimberley coast. The storm paralleled the coast, reaching Category 2 strength before making landfall near Pardoo early on 31 January. The storm dissipated Late on the same day.

Tropical Cyclone Vincent

Cyclone Vincent formed on 7 February 2001, 900 km northwest of Onslow, Western Australia from an active monsoonal trough. Wind shear prevented the tropical low from intensifying for a few days, but once the storm formed it began to move southeast and intensify. Cyclone Vincent crossed the Western Australia coast as a tropical low, a few kilometres south of Broome, Western Australia.

Tropical Cyclone Winsome

Winsome was a weak system that developed from a low in the Gulf of Carpentaria on 8 February.

Torrential rains produced by the storm in the Northern Territory resulted in severe flooding which killed two people.

Tropical Cyclone Wylva

Wylva formed from a low in the Gulf of Carpentaria on 15 February. Wylva briefly became a Category 1 tropical cyclone before making landfall near Booroloola in the morning of 16 February. Even though the system made landfall in a remote area, the remnants of the system caused $13 million in damage and around 700 people had to be evacuated. The remnants of Wylva dissipated on 22 February near Nanutarra.

Tropical Low 10P (07F)

This storm moved from Brisbane's area of responsibility into Fiji's on 16 February. It dissipated on the 18th.

Severe Tropical Cyclone Abigail

On 24 February 2001, Cyclone Abigail formed about 80 km northeast of Cairns, Australia. It then made landfall in Queensland as a Category 1 storm.

Severe Tropical Cyclone Walter

Walter was a storm that formed east of Christmas Island and tracked westward at a low latitude.

On 3 April, Cocos Island was placed under a cyclone watch as Walter approached the island. Throughout 5 April, heavy rains and high winds, estimated up to  battered the area as Walter bypassed the island.

Tropical Cyclone Alistair

The second most damaging cyclone of the 2000–01 cyclone season, Alistair made landfall close to Carnarvon on 24 April 2001 as a poorly organized cyclone. The centre passed just to the north of town with a wind gust to 67 kilometres per hour from the northeast recorded at 4:11 am. Minimum pressure of 1002.9 hPa was recorded at 5 am, followed by the peak recorded wind gust of 90 kilometres per hour from the southeast at 6 am. A total of 24 mm of rainfall was reported in Carnarvon. Plantations to the north of Carnarvon reported 30-40% crop losses, with wind estimates of 100 to 110 kilometres per hour.

Other systems
On 28 November, a tropical low formed near Christmas Island. Moving southeastward, the low was last noted to the south-southwest of Jakarta on 30 November.

On 4 December, the TCWC Brisbane reported that a tropical low formed near the tip of the Cape York Peninsula. Moving southwestward, the primary responsibility of the tropical low was passed to the TCWC Darwin from TCWC Brisbane as the low made landfall near Alyangula. It was last noted on 6 December.

On 7 January, the TCWC Darwin reported that a tropical low developed to the north-northwest of Tiwi Islands. The low slowly moved to the south-southwest, before it was last noted while inland, near Katherine.

Another tropical low formed on 16 March near Christmas Island. Wind shear prevented further intensification, and it dissipated the next day.

On 4 April, a weak tropical low formed to the north of Nhulunbuy. It was last seen the next day.

Season effects
This is a table of all of the storms that have formed in the 2000–01 Australian region cyclone season. It includes their duration, names, landfall(s)–denoted by bold location names – damages, and death totals. Damage and deaths include totals while the storm was extratropical, a wave, or a low, and all of the damage figures are in 2001 AUD and USD.

|-
| Sam ||  || bgcolor=#|Category 5 severe tropical cyclone || bgcolor=#| || bgcolor=#| || Western Australia || Minor || Minor || None ||
|-
| Terri ||  || bgcolor=#|Category 2 tropical cyclone || bgcolor=#| || bgcolor=#| || Western Australia ||  ||  ||
|-
| Vincent ||  || bgcolor=#|Category 2 tropical cyclone || bgcolor=#| || bgcolor=#| || Western Australia ||  ||  ||
|-
| Winsome ||  || bgcolor=#|Category 1 tropical cyclone || bgcolor=#| || bgcolor=#| || Northern Territory ||   ||  ||
|-
| Wylva ||  || bgcolor=#|Category 1 tropical cyclone || bgcolor=#| || bgcolor=#| || Northern Australia ||  ||  ||
|-
| 10P ||  || bgcolor=#|Tropical Low || bgcolor=#| || bgcolor=#| || None || None || None || None ||
|-
| Abigail ||  || bgcolor=#|Category 3 severe tropical cyclone || bgcolor=#| || bgcolor=#| || Queensland, Northern Territory,Western Australia || None || None || None ||
|-
| Walter ||  || bgcolor=#|Category 3 severe tropical cyclone || bgcolor=#| || bgcolor=#| || Cocos Islands || None || None || None ||
|-
| Alistair ||  || bgcolor=#| || bgcolor=#| || bgcolor=#| || Northern Territory, Western Australia ||  ||  ||
|-

See also

 List of Southern Hemisphere tropical cyclone seasons
 Atlantic hurricane seasons: 2000, 2001
 Pacific hurricane seasons: 2000, 2001
 Pacific typhoon seasons: 2000, 2001
 North Indian Ocean cyclone seasons: 2000, 2001

References

External links
 Joint Typhoon Warning Center (JTWC) .
 Australian Government Bureau of Meteorology.
 World Meteorological Organization
 WMO Annual Summary of Global Tropical Cyclone Seasons 2000
 WMO Annual Summary of Global Tropical Cyclone Seasons 2001
 Joint Typhoon Warning Center 1999 ATCR
 Raw cyclone track data
 BoM Monthly Significant Weather Summaries
 July 2000 to June 2001 Tropical Cyclone Summaries and Operational Track Data
 Gary Padgett's Southern Hemisphere 2000-2001 Tropical Cyclone Season Review

{{DEFAULTSORT:2000-01 Australian Region 
Cyclone Season}}
 
Australian region cyclone seasons
2000 Aus
2001 Aus